Poltavskaya is a rural locality (a stanitsa) and the administrative center of Krasnoarmeysky District of Krasnodar Krai, Russia, located on the Kuban River,  west of Krasnodar. Population:

History
Founded in 1794, it is one of the first forty settlements of Kuban Cossacks in the area. It was named after one of the 40 kurins that composed the Zaporizhian Cossacks Host. Initially the locality was known as kurin and accounted for only 460 people (298 men and 162 women). In 1807 it was almost completely destroyed by neighboring local mountainous tribes. Its status of stanitsa, the locality received in 1842. It supported the creation of the Kuban People's Republic.

In 1932-1933, the whole locality was claimed by the Black boards of shame a settlement award for failure to cooperate with the state policies. During that time hundreds of local families died due to hunger as they were not allowed to leave their residence. Later the rest of population was forcefully moved to the northern regions of Russia (to what now is the Komi Republic) for continuing sabotage, and it was re-settled by the families of the Soviet military. At the same time, it was renamed Krasnoarmeyskaya. The original name was returned in the 1990s.

Radio transmission
It is used for transmitting the RJH63 time signal and the RSDN-20 radio navigation signal. The antenna system consists of seven guyed masts, six of which are arranged in a row around a central mast. As a result of its military importance, the facility is not shown on official maps and there are no technical data available.

References

Rural localities in Krasnodar Krai
Krasnoarmeysky District, Krasnodar Krai